This is a list of integrable models as well as classes of integrable models in physics.

Integrable models in 1+1 dimensions

In classical and quantum field theory:

free boson
free fermion
sine-Gordon model
Thirring model
sinh-Gordon model
Liouville field theory
Bullough–Dodd model
Dym equation
Calogero–Degasperis–Fokas equation
Camassa–Holm equation
Drinfeld–Sokolov–Wilson equation
Benjamin–Ono equation
SS model
sausage model
Toda field theories
O(N)-symmetric non-linear sigma models
Ernst equation
massless Schwinger model
supersymmetric sine-Gordon model
supersymmetric sinh-Gordon model
conformal minimal models
critical Ising model
tricritical Ising model
3-state Potts model
various perturbations of conformal minimal models
superconformal minimal models
Wess–Zumino–Witten model
Nonlinear Schroedinger equation
Korteweg–de Vries equation
modified Korteweg–de Vries equation
Gardner equation
Gibbons–Tsarev equation
Hunter–Saxton equation
Kaup–Kupershmidt equation
XXX spin chain
XXZ spin chain
XYZ spin chain
6-vertex model
8-vertex model
Kondo Model
Anderson impurity model
Chiral Gross–Neveu model

Integrable models in 2+1 dimensions
 Ishimori equation
 Kadomtsev–Petviashvili equation
 Landau–Lifshitz–Gilbert equation
 Novikov–Veselov equation

Integrable models in 3+1 dimensions

Self-dual Yang–Mills equations
 Systems with contact Lax pairs

In quantum mechanics

harmonic oscillator
hydrogen atom
Hooke's atom (Hookium)
Ruijsenaars–Schneider models
Calogero–Moser models
Inverse square root potential
Lambert-W step-potential
 Multistate Landau–Zener Models

See also 
List of quantum-mechanical systems with analytical solutions
List of some well-known classical integrable systems

References

Integrable systems
 Exactly solvable models